ARCA Menards Series may refer to:
ARCA Menards Series, a national racing division in the United States
ARCA Menards Series East, a regional racing division in the eastern United States
ARCA Menards Series West, a regional racing division in the western United States